Mighty Rabbit Studios, Inc. is an American independent video game developer based in Cary, North Carolina.

History 
Mighty Rabbit Studio was founded by Josh Fairhurst and Nicholas Allen. They first met in 2005 while attending Wake Technical Community College and then collaborated on a student project that was never released. Fairhurst went on to North Carolina State University to study computer science. In his senior year, he developed the game Terraform alongside other students. Allen would develop the iOS game Cylinder and obtain a full-time job. While the two had remained friends, Fairhurst chose to establish Mighty Rabbit Studios with two other people in August 2010. However, this arrangement did not work out; as Fairhurst was in need of help, Allen quit his job and joined Mighty Rabbit Studios full-time. Together, they joined the game development incubator Joystick Labs, where they developed the game Saturday Morning RPG. Separately from the game's development, Mighty Rabbit Studios released quickly developed games about contemporary topics, branded "Mighty Minis". Among them, Bed Intruders was released for Android, iOS, and for web browsers via Kongregate. The studio also brought Cylinder to the Xbox 360 via Xbox Live Arcade. Saturday Morning RPG was released for iOS in April 2012.

Games developed

References

External links 
 

2010 establishments in North Carolina
American companies established in 2010
Companies based in Cary, North Carolina
Privately held companies based in North Carolina
Video game companies established in 2010
Video game companies of the United States
Video game development companies